Brian Philip Wernicke (born 26 June 1958) is an American geologist and a professor of geology. He has been the Chandler Family Professor of Geology at the California Institute of Technology in Pasadena, California since 2001.

Wernicke has a BS (1978) in Geology from the University of Southern California and Ph.D. (1982) from Massachusetts Institute of Technology. He was a professor at Harvard University from September 1983 to January 1992.

Wernicke received the Young Scientist Award (Donath Medal) in 1991.

References

External links

1958 births
Living people
University of Southern California alumni
Massachusetts Institute of Technology School of Science alumni
California Institute of Technology faculty
American geologists
People from Los Angeles